Stacey McKenzie (born March 27, 1977) is a Jamaican-born Canadian model, runway coach, motivational speaker, and television personality. McKenzie has been a judge on the reality television shows America's Next Top Model, Canada's Next Top Model, and Canada's Drag Race.

Career
Unprepared for the challenges of a modelling career, McKenzie returned to Canada to finish high school. Soon after that, she moved to Paris, France to pursue modelling further. During her first season, she modelled for top designers including Jean Paul Gaultier, Thierry Mugler and Christian Lacroix.

In February 2012, McKenzie was a panellist on Canada Reads, defending Dave Bidini's book On a Cold Road. On the first day, McKenzie controversially cast a tie-breaking vote to eliminate Prisoner of Tehran.

McKenzie was a main judge on the first season of reality television show Canada's Next Top Model in 2006.

In September 2019, McKenzie was announced as one of three permanent judges on Canada's Drag Race, the Canadian version of RuPaul's Drag Race.

In May 2021, McKenzie and her Canada's Drag Race co-judges Brooke Lynn Hytes and Jeffrey Bowyer-Chapman won the Canadian Screen Award for Best Host or Presenter in a Factual or Reality/Competition Series at the 9th Canadian Screen Awards.

Filmography
McKenzie made her acting debut in the 1996 film Portraits Chinois, but gained more attention in the 1997 film, The Fifth Element, as a VIP Stewardess.

Television

References

1976 births
Living people
Black Canadian women
Canadian female models
Canadian women television personalities
Jamaican emigrants to Canada
Participants in Canadian reality television series
Canadian Screen Award winners
Black Canadian broadcasters